In Greek mythology, the name Batea or Bateia was the daughter or (less commonly) the aunt of King Teucer.  She was the mother of Ilus, Erichthonius, and Zacynthus. A hill in the Troad and the town Bateia were named after her.

Mythology 
Batia's father was the ruler of a tribe known as the Teucrians (Teucri). The Teucrians inhabited the area of northwest Asia Minor later called the Troad (Troas). She married King Dardanus, son of Zeus and Electra, whom Teucer named as his heir. By Dardanus, Batea was the mother of Ilus, Erichthonius, and Zacynthus. 

In some accounts, Arisbe of Crete, a daughter of Teucer, is mentioned as the wife of Dardanus. Arisbe and Batea are usually assumed to be the same person. According to another version of the myth, Batia was the daughter of Tros, instead of Teucer.

Batea gave her name to a hill in the Troad, mentioned in the Iliad, as well as to the town of Bateia.

Trojan family tree

Notes

References 

 Apollodorus, The Library with an English Translation by Sir James George Frazer, F.B.A., F.R.S. in 2 Volumes, Cambridge, MA, Harvard University Press; London, William Heinemann Ltd. 1921. ISBN 0-674-99135-4. Online version at the Perseus Digital Library. Greek text available from the same website.
 Conon, Fifty Narrations, surviving as one-paragraph summaries in the Bibliotheca (Library) of Photius, Patriarch of Constantinople translated from the Greek by Brady Kiesling. Online version at the Topos Text Project.
 Dionysus of Halicarnassus, Roman Antiquities. English translation by Earnest Cary in the Loeb Classical Library, 7 volumes. Harvard University Press, 1937-1950. Online version at Bill Thayer's Web Site
 Dionysius of Halicarnassus, Antiquitatum Romanarum quae supersunt, Vol I-IV. . Karl Jacoby. In Aedibus B.G. Teubneri. Leipzig. 1885. Greek text available at the Perseus Digital Library.
 Homer, The Iliad with an English Translation by A.T. Murray, Ph.D. in two volumes. Cambridge, MA., Harvard University Press; London, William Heinemann, Ltd. 1924. Online version at the Perseus Digital Library.
 Homer, Homeri Opera in five volumes. Oxford, Oxford University Press. 1920. Greek text available at the Perseus Digital Library.
 Lycophron, The Alexandra  translated by Alexander William Mair. Loeb Classical Library Volume 129. London: William Heinemann, 1921. Online version at the Topos Text Project.
 Lycophron, Alexandra translated by A.W. Mair. London: William Heinemann; New York: G.P. Putnam's Sons. 1921. Greek text available at the Perseus Digital Library.
 Stephanus of Byzantium, Stephani Byzantii Ethnicorum quae supersunt, edited by August Meineike (1790-1870), published 1849. A few entries from this important ancient handbook of place names have been translated by Brady Kiesling. Online version at the Topos Text Project.

Princesses in Greek mythology
Queens in Greek mythology
Trojans